This is the list of characters from Disney's comic book/animated series Monster Allergy.

Protagonists

Ezekiel Zick 
Ezekiel 'Zick' Barrymore (Ezechiele Zick in the original Italian version) is a fictional character and the male protagonist in the comic book and animated TV series, Monster Allergy. In the animated series, he is voiced by Holly Gauthier-Frankel in English, Monica Ward in Italian and Féodor Atkine in French.
Zick is a young boy who is considered "strange" for his ability to see monsters others cannot see. He suffers from rather peculiar allergies that allow him to sense dangerous monsters.

Elena Potato 
Elena Potato (Elena Patata in the original Italian version) is a fictional character and the female protagonist in the comic book and the animated TV series, Monster Allergy. In the animated series, she is voiced by Annie Bovaird in English, Monica Ward in Italian and Marie-Laure Dougnac in French.

Elena is Ezekiel Zick's Italian best friend around his age. She helps him in their adventures. She adores cats and the world of invisible monsters.

Antagonists

Major antagonists

Magnacat
Magnacat is president of Pyramid Inc., a kitchen appliance store, but he is also an extremely powerful Gorka. Magnacat's powers include shape-shifting, hypnosis, mind-control, flight and various dangerous magical spells. When in human form Magnacat has blond hair and wears a green business suit. He is the main antagonist of the first season of the animated series. His goal was to create an army of Androgorkas, and capture the Tutors to control the prisoner monsters to get his revenge on Bibbur-Si, from which he was exiled long ago. Magnacat ended up being eaten by the Dark Phantom, Captain Bristlebeard. Magnacat survived being eaten and escapes albeit as an ooze. In his weakened state he was confined to a capsule to regain his body and strength. In the show before the series starts, he defeated Zob, Zick's father, and Terrence, another tamer. He shrunk Zob while turning Terrence into stone. He fought the Tamers various times making several attempts to take down Bibbur-Si and gain control of the Tamers but failed each time. Due to suffering numerous losses in fighting the Tamers, his company went into bankruptcy. As a last resort, Magnacat ordered Viziosed to get the Horn of Kong to summon the Monster-Saur. His control over the monster was not complete, however, and he formed a loose alliance with the Tamers to stop it. After a short skirmish in the beast's stomach, Zick and Elena escaped, trapping Magnacat and Viziosed inside. The Monster-Saur was defeated and put into a Dombox while they were still inside. Being in one Dombox together, Magnacat began to devour the monster from the inside, absorbing its power.

In the second season of the animated series, he was able to escape along with Viziosed by absorbing the energy of Monster-Saur to confuse the Dombox into releasing them. He was defeated and sealed into a special Dombox that he cannot escape again.

In the comic book series, he is the main antagonist in the issues 2–4, 13–14, but he was defeated by the Tamers.

Magnacat is voiced by: Roberto Draghetti (Italian), Al Goulem (English).

Moog Magister

Moog Magister is one of the main antagonists in the second season of the animated series. He is the lord of the Anguane witches, with Emily as second-in-command. He used an amulet to mind-control Bombolo into disabling the defenses of the Ancient Armory to get the monsters in the crypt, but the attack was repelled by the young Tamers. Moog tries to defeat the tamers in various ways with his magic. He gets frustrated with his failures and threatens to kill all the Angunes. When Emily brought Hector Sinistro to him and learns about the Hundred and First Door in the Ancient Armory, he then quickly kills Emily as she no longer has any use to him, and makes a deal with Sinistro. He and Sinistro sneak into the Hundred and First Door. At the crypt, he uses his magical bag to get all the Domboxes, but quickly finds that it was a trap, as lava started rising when they opened the Hundred and First Door. After getting lost inside the Armory, he encounters Bombolo who has eaten his magical bag, and pursues him through the Armory. He encounters and fights Zick, he then grabs the key which is destroyed because only a Tamer can hold it. He perished by falling in the lava.

In the comic book series, he is an antagonist. He plans to control a giant Gaiga monster called the No Name with a small device to summon it. When he finally controls the No Name, he quickly throws Emily into the sea and attacks Bibbur-Si. However, he was defeated by the young Tamers when they combined their Dom energy into a giant ball. The monster, famished by centuries of imprisonment, ate the Energy along with Moog.

Hector Sinistro

Hector Sinistro is a Dark Tamer, and one of the main antagonists in the second season of the animated series. He has two left hands since his right hand is also a left hand. He tries to get revenge against Zob, by attacking his son, Zick. In the past, he was a respected Tamer until he was discovered by Zob to be selling illegal captured monsters to an auction, to the Anguanes. He was turned in was marked as a renegade Tamer or Dark Tamer and was banished from the Armory. Emily brought Sinistro to the Moog Magister to help him get to the Ancient Armory by going through the Hundred and First Door. He agrees to help Moog to get Domboxes in the crypt so he can get the Scepter Dom. He betrays Moog and leaves him to die in the door's trap, which was rising lava. He uses Bombo to escape and the rest of the monsters to attack the Tamers to cover his escape. However, he uses the Scepter Dom too much he and as a result was turned into a small, weak monster. After that he ended up becoming Bombolo's pet.

In the comic book series, Hectro is 783 human years old. This Tamer was imprisoned for life for his crimes against monsters. Hectro was labeled as a freak in his childhood because he was born with two left hands but was not left-handed. He is sinister by nature, turning his passion for the circus into a nightmare. Sinistro represents one of the darkest moments of the history of Tamers. He was captured by Ezeria Zick but later escaped through cracks in his Dombox, which, because of his passion for the circus, was styled as a carnival. After his escape, he kidnapped Bombo and the other monsters to show in his horrible circus. Bombo alone, because of his stomach, was forced to give up his invisibility and fight in a wrestling ring as the Great Chumbo, swallowing his opponents and spitting them out. This was a great hit for Hectro as Bombo made him a lot of money. Zick and Elena came to rescue Bombo, breaking the other monsters out of prison. They tried to stop Hectro but he had escaped. Hectro was seen again where he has gathered some Dark Tamers to attack the Ancient Armory, and managed to kidnap Elena and forced Zick to give up all his Dom power in order to save her, but Dom energy that was kept in the Dombox was too much to contain and exploded, killing him along with other Dark Tamers.

Minor antagonists

Omnised and Omniquod

Omnised and Omniquod are Gorka brothers who act as Magnacat's minions. They sometimes fight each other over which one of them is right. Omnised was the first of the two to appear in the show. Both were captured in their first appearances. Omnised hypnotized Elena to free him from the Dombox, and took Omniquod with him. They flooded Zick's cellar, giving him a cold. They carried out Magnacat's orders after he was eaten by Bristlebeard. Later on, near the end of the first season, Omniquod was captured by Teddy Thaur, while Omnised was captured again by Zick.

When in human forms, they have little hair behind their ears, and wear sunglasses and black bodyguard business suits.

In the comic book series, Omnised appeared in issue 4 and 21, while Omniquod was only in issue 21.

Viziosed
Viziosed is a large, red Gorka and one of the best agents of Magnacat. He made his first appearance to Zick after the Vulture's attack on Bibbur-Si, since that marked the capture of Omnised (Omniquod having been captured earlier). He secretly stole the Horn of Kong Teddy had taken from the Ancient Armoury and attempted to summon the Monster-Saur for his master. The horn did not work properly, however, as it lacked a pendant Teddy had taken, and Viziosed and Magnacat were attacked by the disobedient Monster-Saur. They formed a temporary alliance with the Tamers to stop the monster but were eventually swallowed by the monster, along with Zick and Elena. The Gorkas attempted to obtain the horn from Zick in the Monster-Saur's body but it accidentally fell into a pool of acid and was destroyed. Magnacat, in a final attempt to destroy his nemesis, attacked Zick himself, along with Viziosed. They were defeated, however, and remained in the monster's stomach while Zick and Elena escaped. Zick proceeded to trap the monster in his Universal Dombox, trapping Magnacat and Viziosed with it. The Dombox classified Viziosed as highly dangerous.

However, Magnacat, being very powerful, managed to devour the Monster-Saur from the inside, allowing him and Viziosed to escape their prison. Viziosed proceeded to shapeshift into a powerful monster and defeated Jeremy shortly after the start of the Tamers' Tournament, after having incapacitated Teddy. Magnacat then hypnotised all other Tamers, except for the younger ones, and ordered them to have the children evacuate from the Ancient Armoury due to the monster attacks (really Viziosed). Zick, Teddy, Bobby, Lay and Elena fled using a secret tunnel, but encountered the monster, who revealed himself to be Viziosed. He smashed the bridge they were standing on, dropping everyone but Zick into the abyss, while taking the boy himself with him. Zick escaped, however, and sought help, only to discover all of his allies had been hypnotised. Magnacat revealed himself and announced his escape and vengeance, ordering his slaves to attack Zick. The latter nearly escaped, but was met by Viziosed. Zick quickly grabbed a pair of teleskates and fled to Bibbur-Si, away from the Gorkas. With Trengingigan's aid, Zick returned to find his friends well and alive. He fought Magnacat and eventually captured him in a special giant Dombox using a densifier, while Viziosed was trapped by Trengingigan.

Dark Phantoms

Dark Phantoms are ghosts that are willing to gain life by eating monsters and Tamers. As they consume more they become very destructive, and turn into living ghosts (half-monster, half-ghost). Some Dark Phantoms attack in a small to a large group, and they can fire rays that capture their enemies or prey.

These are the Dark Phantoms known in the series: Bristlebeard the pirate, Lester the night watchman with his dog Briba, the Blacksmith brothers, Baht Belasco and crewmen of the Unicorn, and two smugglers: Shooter and Jones.

Bristlebeard

Bristlebeard is the first Dark Phantom seen in the series, and the captain of the pirate ship "The Unicorn". He was summoned by Zick to help defeat Magnacat by eating him and his Androgorkas. He turned on Zick when he tried to eat him because he is a Tamer, but retreated when Zick overpowered him. Later on, he was tracked down by Zick and Elena to find his treasure to save Greta's Flower Shop. While searching for his treasure and fighting him, they later learned he loved a woman named Olivia and he was searching for her but it was unsuccessful, and his real name is Horacio. He was defeated when Zick let himself be eaten by him, and used the Universal Dombox to dissolve his body.

He reappears in the second season; he was summoned by Zick using the Voice Dom, and he stated that he met Olivia again in the afterlife and doesn't eat monsters any more. He helps Zick and Elena to stop and recapture his ship from his first mate Baht Belasco and crewmen by using a second spare ship, the Mullet, to fight them. After defeating them, he manages to talk to them and help them go to the afterlife with the Unicorn, and give the Mullet to Bombo as a reward.

Emily Vermeer

Emily Vermeer is Zick's aunt. She's very rich and uncaring to Zick's family. She later appears as the leader of the Anguanes, and is known to them as the Anguana of Er. Zick goes to her for the cure to Zob's curse. After multiple betrayals, she, unwillingly, tells Zick how to return Zob back to normal. She appears again to buy the captured monster in the cellar, but Zick quickly rejected the offers. She then sends the Anguanes to kidnap Zick and use him as a bargaining chip to make Zob work for her, yet they fail to capture him and end up fixing up the house next door, the Potato's house. 

She reappears again in the second season, as an assistant of Moog Magister, the lord of the witches. She and her Anguanes along with their master attack the Armory to get the monsters from the crypt, but failed due to the intervention of the young Tamers and Zick. She was ordered by Moog Magister to pour a metamorphic potion on the bottled waters to turn Zick into a monster. They went back the Forest of Cham to celebrate their vengeance and plans, but it was short-lived when the Anguanes Fair was burned down due to the fight between Teddy and Bobby against Zick as a Bommerbang that later returned to normal with Elena's help. She appears again when she created a fear formula that makes anyone see frightening images, which causes panic in Oldmill on Halloween, and quickly uses it against Zick and Elena along with the monsters of the Barrymore house. However, her plans were foiled by Bombo along with Zick and Elena when they were cured by laughter, and she and the Anguanes had been affected by their own fear formula. When Zick and Elena along with Bowleg sneak into her house, she plans to turn the vampire to dust and use his ashes to make potions. When they manage to escape and Bowleg threatens her, she cooperates and makes an antidote to make Bowleg human again. When Bowleg was human again, she suddenly plans to turn them into lizards with her black book of spells, but Zick fires his energy Dom that destroys the black book and causes a fire that destroys her laboratory. After they escape her house, she plans to get revenge on them. She again along with the Anguanes help their master, Moog Magister, to cast a spell on Zick to create an illusion. Zick wakes from the illusion, and tries to capture him but got overpowered by him. When they help their master escape, they made their escapes too. She and the Anguanes try to please their Master by throwing a party to celebrate his 301st birthday, but Moog Magister ended up destroying the party and plans to kill all the Anguanes for their failure. She begs for Moog to give her one more chance to help get monsters, and she was able to bring Hector Sinistro. As she asks his master who was planning to leave, she was quickly killed by Moog for no longer being any use to him.

She is married to Olsen Barrymore (Theo Barrymore's brother in the comic book series), making her related to Greta and Zick.

Anguanes

The Anguanes are merchant witches, and live in a hollowed out tree underground in the Forest of Cham. They capture monsters to make potions and spells, and completely follow their leader Emily Vermeer (Zick's aunt), also known as the Anguana of Er, as well as Moog Magister the Lord of the Witches. They sometimes use their potion to attack their enemies, and love to experiment with new recipes. They came into Elena's house while she was having a sleepover.

Black Fires

First seen in the 22nd issue, a Black Fire is a horrendous creature, a Dark Phantom that has reached the bottom of the abyss. Elena had awakened one of these creatures and endangered Bombo and Snyakutz Bu.

Supporting characters

Zick's family

Greta Barrymore
Greta Barrymore is Zick's mother and lives with him in the Barrymore house. She owns a flower shop, and her husband is Zobedja Zick. She is friendly to anyone. She eavesdropped on Zick while he was first fighting Magnacat which lead her to reveal that she too can see monsters and ghosts. She hid this ability because didn't want her son to end up like his father. She made a Bombo-like costume for Zick on Halloween to trick-or-treat with Elena. When Elena and Zick go to the Ancient Armory for a cure for Lonzo she reveals where was the entire time Zob. She and Zob wanted to wait until Zick is ready for the truth. When Zob returns to his normal size she suggests that he share the cure with Terrence. While reluctant at first Zob agrees. She and Johanna convince Zob to be reacquainted with Terrence. When learning that Jeremy was mind-controlled and captured by Magnacat, she gave the gift of 'Sight' to Elena to save him.

In the comic book series, Greta is a loving mom and wife. She gives the gift of sight to Elena when Elena is being left out of saving Bibbur-Si from the Giga-Monster.

Greta is voiced by: Alessandra Korompay (Italian), Pauline Little (English).

Zobedja "Zob" Zick

Zobedja Zick or Zob is Zick's father and the husband of Greta Barrymore. He was shrunk after battling against Magnacat. He was returned to normal with the Breath of Mugalak. Elena and Zick convince Zob to share the cure with Terrence, who was turned to stone in the same incident. Greta and Johanna persuade him to get repair his relationship with Terrence even though he blames him for being shrunk for years, and he agrees to do it while going to Port Reef with the rest of the family and transporting Chumba Bagingi. He and Terrence always argue over which one of them was the best when they fought an army of Big Bonz Eaters. While fighting together against a Squark, they got scolded by their wives when the kids were in trouble because of them. He and Terrence have forgiven each other and become friends again. Zob was worried about not being able to support his family and being a burden to them. Then Emily offers him a deal to sell her canned monsters which he rejects.  Greta offers him a job delivering flowers for her flower shop which he accepts. When he and Jeremy discovered Magnacat's new plan of buying the skyscraper that holds the Suspended City, they were there to prevent it. When Zick and Elena stop the Sphinx, they give their respect to them. He made a formula that helps grow plants faster but the smell was so strong it can knock someone out. When they learned about the alliance between the Gorkas and Dark Phantoms, he and the Thaur family tried to stop them but they were too many Dark Phantoms. He also organized a Tamers meeting to help stop Magnacat. When they went to the Ancient Armory for a meeting, they were attacked by Magnacat with his Gorka-droid to defeat them all at once. When learning about a second invasion of Bibbur-Si, he and the rest of the adult Tamers help repel the invasion with the help of the Maximum Tutors. When Magnacat summoned the Monster-Saur to defeat them, he and rest of the Tamers attack it and stop Magncat, but they were all taken down by the Monster-Saur. He was impressed that Zick and Elena defeated Magnacat and captured the Monster-Saur. He was also seen celebrating the end of the exile.

In issue 22 in the comic series, Zob was fired from working in Greta's flower shop and had to sleep on the couch that day. In the same issue, in a bet with his father, Zob got a job as an ice-cream maker, making his father lose his bet so he had to go on a diet. In issue 23, Zob was afraid that he was not making enough money for his family, thus he tried to get a job at the museum as an entomologist. Unfortunately, while chasing a monster, Zick had destroyed the dinosaur exhibition, causing Zob to lose the job opportunity. In the end, Zob found out that Zick is happy just having him as a father.

Zob is voiced by: Andrea Ward (Italian), Mark Camacho (English).

Theo Barrymore and Tessa Grange

Theo and Tessa are both white ghosts, and Zick's maternal grandparents. At home, Zick is in continuous contact with his dead grandparents, who often provide valuable suggestions and wise advice to their grandson. They were good friends with Ezeria and Maria Zick, Zick's other grandparents.

Theo and Tessa are voiced by: Pietro Ubaldi and Caterina Rochira (Italian).

Ezeria Zick and Maria Bertold

First seen in issue 20, Ezeria and Maria are Zick's paternal grandparents. When Terrence Thaur and Zob went to fight the Pipluor (issue 13) Ezeria didn't approve of his decision, nonetheless covering up Zob's escape by pretending to argue all day with him, fooling Timothy into believing that Zob never left the house. When Zob lost his powers, the Maximum Tutors decided to separate the Zick family by sending Ezeria and Maria to a Detention Oasis in Eilenou. After the Tamers were set free from the Detention Oasis in issue 20, Zob had decided to look for them, only to find they had decided to visit instead and the family was reunited once again. In issue 23, Ezeria made a bet with Zob that if Zob could find a job, Ezeria would go on a diet. Of course, Zob won, accepting a job as an ice-cream maker, and Ezeria went on a diet. They were good friends with Theo and Tessa and were upset that they died, but brightened when they saw their ghosts.

Monsters

Bombo

Bombo is one of the monsters in Zick's house under the supervision of Timothy, and later Jeremy. His crime is ignoring his diet and stealing some cakes. He likes eating Zick's shoes, and cries when dieting. Bombo is afraid of Jeremy and in the animated series, has nightmares about Jeremy foiling his plans to steal Zick's shoes.

In the second season, he tags along with Zick and Elena to make himself useful to them, often turning out to be a vital element, even after they refuse to let him join them.

In issue 24 of the comic series, Bombo and the other monsters were kidnapped by Hectro Sinistro. He alone was forced to give up his invisibility and fight in a wrestling ring as the Great Chumbo. Hectro made him eat Zick, but through telepathy, Zick helped him fake the act and break the spell. Bombo helped Zick defeat Sinistro, but he got away. In the end, Bombo was upset because his last wrestling match was not shown on television. To cheer him up, Elena and Zick placed a giant balloon of 'Chumbo' on top of the house.

Bombo is voiced by Pietro Ubaldi (Italian), Rick Jones (English).

Snyakutz Bu

Snyakutz Bu is another monster in Zick's house under the supervision of Timothy and later Jeremy. His crime is littering (leaving pieces of himself everywhere). He is Bombo's closest friend and accompanies him in stealing Zick's shoes.

In the 24th issue of the comic series, he, Clak-Ritak, Ben-Talak and Lali (a monster in the Barrymore house) were forced to be displayed in a circus. As they were kidnapped, Bu lost one of his eyes, which led Zick and Elena to where they were captured.

Snyakutz Bu is voiced by Riccardo Peroni (Italian), Gordon Masten (English).

Clak-Ritak

Clak-Ritak is a Bobak, yet another monster in the Barrymores' Detention Oasis. His crime is playing a violin horribly out of tune. He was one of the monsters who were put on display on Sinistro's circus in the 24th issue.

Ben-Talak

Ben-Talak is also a Bobak, and another monster in the Barrymores' Detention Oasis. His crime is telling made-up stories and lying. He was also one of the monsters who were put on display on Sinistro's circus in the 24th issue.

Ben-Talak is voiced by Claudio Moneta (Italian).

Trengingigan

Trengingigan is the legendary Gorka-hunter in Bibbur-Si. He is a Gingi with an eye patch on his right eye. He first appeared when Zick and Timothy needed help to stop Magnacat from making more Androgorkas. Later he was impersonated by Omniquod while the real one went to the Barrymore house to warn Timothy about the plot. He appears later to help Zick to capture Omnised and Omniquod and to get hot cappuccino on Halloween. He stated that the reason he wears an eye patch, since his right eye is good, is to look cool.

In the second season of the animated series, he helped Zick when he arrived in Bibbur-Si and told him that Magncacat was back. He and Zick went back to the armory to stop Magnacat and met up with Bobby, Elena, Lay and Teddy. He helped Zick and the other Tamers to stop him, and captured Viziosed.

Trengingigan is voiced by Riccardo Rovatti (Italian).

Chumba Bagingi
Chumba Bagingi is one of the monsters under Lardine's Detention Oasis. He is an exhibitionist, a monster who makes himself visible to humans. He escaped when Lardine was resting in Elena's house. He was saved by Zick and Elena from two Dark Phantoms, and later was captured by Zick. He was seen again inside a Dombox mocking Zick and Elena about finding a cure for Zob. He was then used as a trade for information about Zick to Emily Vermeer, and was released from his Dombox, destroying half of the Anguanes Fair. He was captured again by Zick after being begged by Emily Vermeer to stop him. He reappears by trying to get out of his Dombox and knocking other Domboxes. He was released by Zick to free him from Omnised and Omniquod, and returned to Lardine's Detention Oasis in Port Reef. He also persuades Lardine to make the lighthouse light, just to make his fellow monsters happy.

In the second season, he reappeared again inside a Dombox in Zick's cellar, until he was freed by his lover, Chumbamba. When he and Chumbamba saw Zick and Elena rehearsing a play, they decide to join the play by making themselves visible and being attracted to the play. During the play, another Gingi named Bunganga was trying to sabotage the play and to attack Chumba as the phantoms, pretending that he loves Chumbamba. When the play was over and Bunganga was captured by Zick, Zob told him and Chumbamba they will be sent to the Detention Oasis in Port Reef.

In the comic book series issue 19, he escaped again and went to Foggy Island, later to be tracked down and captured by Zick, Elena, and Timothy and returned once again to Lardine's Detention Oasis.

Chumba Bagingi is voiced by Claudio Moneta (Italian).

Bram-Bombak
Bram-Bombak is one of the teachers in the Ancient Armory in the animated series. He is an expert in Monsterology. He wears glasses and uses a magnifying glass, but still has a hard time seeing. His skin is yellow and orange.

In the comic book series, he was a caretaker of the Ancient Armory without the glasses and the magnifying glass, and his skin is purple and pink.

Bram-Bombak is voiced by Rick Jones (English).

Bim-Bombak and Bobbabu
Bim-Bombak and Bobbabu are the chefs in the Ancient Armory.

Bim-Bombak and Bobbabu are voiced by Rick Jones and Terrence Scammell respectively, in the English version.

Bombolo
Bombolo is a baby Bombo. In the animated series, he was used by Moog Magister to disable the defense system and to capture the monsters in the Ancient Armory, under the control of a pendant. Later he was released from the control of the witches by Zick. Elena decided to take care of him and to practice being a Keeper. In the episode "A Kingdom for Bombolo", he was Prince Kamilo the Second of Kamuludum-Si, the city of baby Bombos, who disappeared from his kingdom due to serious circumstances.

In the comic book series, he was given to Elena by Timothy to practice her skills, and his crime was pooping in his diaper and farting all the time.

Bombolo is voiced by Jodie Resther (English).

Tutors

Timothy-Moth
Timothy is Zick's cat and Tutor. He is very mysterious and sarcastic but a great help to Zick. He is in charge of the Detention Oasis of the Barrymores' house, and later was replaced by Jeremy-Joth for violating too many rules of Bibbur-Si. Since then, he has resided in Bibbur-Si, but appears later on in the series. Later in the comic book and the animated series, Timothy returns to his position as guardian of the Barrymore house when the exile was ended, and the monsters didn't want to go back to Bibbur-Si.

Timothy is voiced by Oliviero Dinelli (Italian), Michel Perron (English).

Lardine

Her real name is Larraby Tuth, but prefers to be called by her nickname Lardine. She is the only female cat and Tutor seen in both the show and comic book series. She is in charge of the Detention Oasis at Port Reef. She is seen in episodes "Cat in the Pot", "The Pyramid of the Invulnerable", "Magnacat", "Terror in the Deep" and "Family Reunion". In the comic book series, it was shown that she had feelings for Timothy.

Lardine is voiced by Cinzia Massironi (Italian).

Jeremy-Joth

Jeremy is the strictest of the four Maximum Tutors. He became Timothy's replacement when the latter violated too many rules of Bibbur-Si. He has controlled the Barrymores' house since then, being mean to both Zick and the monsters.

Magnacat once controlled his mind to capture Zick in the episode "The Devourer", sabotaging his teleskates which ended up teleporting him to Magnacat's secret lair. The Devourer absorbed all of Zick's Dom energy, causing him to lose his ability to see and fight monsters. Jeremy then attacks Elena in the sewers who was trying to find out what he was doing until the digesting plant stops him. He was freed from the mind control effect after the digesting plant knocked him out.

Even though Jeremy is harsh and strict, he has a softer side and cares for Zick and Elena as evidenced in "The Devourer", when he is glad that he didn't hurt Elena while under Magnacat's control, and when he gets worried about Zick getting captured by Magnacat.

He seems to have a human side; in issue 13, Jeremy got drunk with Timothy and surprised everyone by purring and apologizing. He also allowed Bombo to cuddle him but the hangover didn't last; he was furious to see Bombo cuddling him, and scolded him. At the end of the television series, he seemed to have grown fond of the monsters, according to Theo.

In the second season of the animated series, he was in charge of the Ancient Armory.

Jeremy is voiced by Ambrogio Colombo (Italian), Terrence Scammell (English).

Tamers

Tadduja "Teddy" Thaur
Tadduja Thaur or Teddy is a 14-year-old Tamer, and one of Zick's friends. He is a show-off, arrogant and boastful to anyone. He sometimes respects Zick, but not Elena, who he always calls Potato. He first appears to invite Zick to go hunt monsters in the abandoned factory. He helps Zick to defeat Lester the night watchman with his dog Briba and steals the Fouler that Zick is about to capture. However, he doesn't know the correct technique to can the Fouler that causes the Dombox due to the flirt that was created by the Fouler. He appears again to help Zick and Elena get information to get his father back to normal form. Emily uses him and Elena as a bargain chip by switching their bodies with the other Anguanes. They put aside their differences and manage to break and reverse the spell to revert to their bodies. He also joins with them at Drink Water Park to find the Mugalak. When they got the Breath of Mugalak, he suddenly betrayed them and steals it. As they were fighting, Teddy accidentally caused the cave to collapse thanks to his Dom Energy while using Zick's sunglasses. He was quickly defeated by Zick, and after the cave-in it got his foot stuck. Zick and Elena almost left him behind for betraying them, but thinking that he could still be a friend to them someday, Zick and Elena helped him. The reason for taking the breath is because he wanted to bring his own father, Terrence Thaur, back to normal after being turned into stone, as told by Zick's father. They went to his house and brought his father back to normal. He also got reacquainted with Zick since both families went to Port Reef, and their fathers got reacquainted too. He also came to find Zick, and helps find his father when he decides to comfort Magnacat as well as find Zick's father too. He helps Zick save Elena and to fight off the skeleton army. He also joins with his parent and Zob to fend off an army of Dark Phantoms during an invasion. He also stayed with all the other young Tamers, while the adult Tamers went to Bibbur-Si to repel the invasion. When Zick and Elena decide to go help save Bibbur-Si along with the monster of the Barrymore house, he and the other Tamers join in. When he and Zick found the Horn of Kong, he finds a pendant inside the horn and gave it to Lay. When the Monster-Saur was unleashed by Magnacat and can't control it, he confesses where he got the pendant and tries to stop Magnacat, but he and Lay are knocked into a pool by the Monster-Saur.

He likes his fellow Tamer, Lay Mamery, who ignores him because he is immature. However, he is seen flirting with Lay several times.

In the first season, Teddy was a second level Tamer with yellow Dom energy. In the second season of the animated series, he became a third level Tamer with green Dom energy, and now a fourth level Tamer with blue Dom energy.

After Terrence is restored, he and his mother, Johanna Thaur, were happy to see him. Teddy adores his father and thinks of him as a hero, according to Terrence in issue 13. In issue 22, there is a Tamer named Rudolph Thaur, and whether he is related to Teddy or his family in any way is unknown. In the comic series, Teddy did not go with Zick to get the Mugalak's breath but instead, teamed up with Aunt Emily. He betrayed Zick to get a vial full of the breath but in the end, lost the vial. Zick felt sorry and gave Teddy the sponge he used to collect the breath in hopes that it might help his father too. The two became good friends after. He likes lemon sorbet according to the profile in issue 13. From Timothy's point of view (see Teddy's profile in issue 13), Teddy is arrogant and untrustworthy by nature; Teddy is clearly the son of Terrence as he is intelligent but lazy.

Teddy is voiced by Massimo di Benedetto (Italian), Daniel Brochu (English).

Terrentuja "Terrence" Thaur

Terrentuja Thaur or Terrence is a Tamer, and Teddy's father. He is also a good friend of Zob. He first appeared in "Mugalak!", where he was turned into stone by Magnacat. He later appears in episodes "Family Reunion", "The Return of Magnacat", "The Devourer", "The Last Tamer", "The Great Escape", and "The Horn of Kong". In "Family Reunion" Terrence and Zob kept arguing over who's better. In the end the two became friends (similar to the comic series).

Unlike the television series, Terrence was shrunken like Zob in the comic series. In issue 13, Terrence was brought back to his normal size, but Zob did not trust him because of his betrayal in the past. This betrayal was that Terrence abandoned Zob in the middle of a battle against a Pipluor to save his own life. Terrence did not want Teddy to know this as this would shatter his admiration, so when Teddy and Zick arrived at the scene, Terrence told another lie. The four Tamers fought against each other only to be stopped by Elena. Terrence and Zob still disliked each other, but over time, the two set aside their differences and became friends once again.

Terrence is voiced by Claudio Moneta (Italian), Mark Hauser (English).

Johanna Thaur

Johanna Thaur is a Tamer and is Teddy's mother. She first appeared in "Mugalak!", where she was visited by Zob, Zick and Elena to cure her husband who had been turned into stone by Magnacat with the Breath of Mugalak. She later appears in episodes "Family Reunion", "The Return of Magnacat", "The Devourer", "The Great Escape", and "The Horn of Kong".

In the comic series, Johanna first appeared in issue 13, when Teddy and Zick arrived with the sponge with the Mugalak's breath. Johanna is a loving mother who cares about her son, despite the fact that he goes on adventures behind her back.

Lay Mamery

Lay is a 14-year-old Tamer, one of Zick's new friends. She is admired by the young male Tamers, including Teddy and Zick, a reason that Elena is a bit jealous of her. Lay is both fond of, and impressed by Zick for facing many monsters; on the contrary she sometimes doesn't like Teddy for being immature.

Lay's Tamer level is first level for firing red Dom energy, and in time she is now a fourth level Tamer.

In the comic series, she first appeared in issue 15. There were times when it was shown that Lay has a crush on her teacher Dan Tulasech. In issue 18, she was seen writing Dan's name all over the page of her notebook. In issue 28, she was deeply sorrowed when Dan disappeared. In issue 29, she was seen writing Dan's name in the dirt of the Ancient Armory. Teddy told Lay that the lesson they were having was better than Dan's lessons and she shot him with Dom energy.

Zai, Lyu, and Leniley Mamery

The Mamery Clan is he rest of Lay's family, all female Tamers, who aided Zob and the others in the battle against Magnacat in the first season.    

Zai is a fifth level Tamer, and Lay's grandmother. In the second season, she is a nurse at the Ancient Armory.

Lyu is a third level Tamer, and Lay's younger sister. In the second season, she is a student with the other young Tamers at the Ancient Armory. 

Leniley is a fifth level Tamer, and Lay's mother. In the second season, she is a nurse at the Ancient Armory.

Bobby Clash

Bobby is a new young Tamer in the Ancient Armory, and a new character in the second season of the animated series. He is very handsome and popular among the girls in the Armory, especially Elena and Lay, which made Zick a bit jealous of him. Later on in the series, he is a friend and partner to Teddy Thaur when fighting monsters, and he resides in the Armory and having his own Universal Dombox.

He is a second level Tamer with yellow Dom energy, but he became a fourth level Tamer with blue Dom energy similar to Zick.

He is the only character in the animated series that is not related in the comic book series.

Bobby is voiced by Jodie Resther (English).

Paco, Paul and Raul Luseney

Paco is a fifth level Tamer with white Dom energy, and the father of Paul and Luseney. He is a good friend of Zob, and wears a red bandanna with white dots, a black sleeveless vest, light blue jeans, and boots. In the TV series, he first appeared in the episode, "The Last Tamer", when he and the other Tamers were summoned by Zob to aid in taking down Magnacat. In the second season, he is a weapons training instructor at the Ancient Armory.

In the comic series, he debuted in issue 15, alongside his two sons, Paul and Raul.

Paul & Raul are twin brothers, young Tamers, and sons of Paco Luseney. Raul is a fourth level with blue Dom energy. He wears a blue T-shirt, and a purple cap. Paul is also a fourth level, with a red T-shirt, a blue cap, and orange goggles. In the TV series, they both first appeared alongside their father in the episode, "The Last Tamer". In Season 2, they are seen as students in the Ancient Armory, and assist the other Tamers on missions. 

Paul & Raul are voiced by Jodie Resther and Holly Gauthier-Frankel (English).

Dan & Cal Tulasech

Dan is a fifth level Tamer with white Dom Energy, and the father of his son, Cal.  He is one of many good friends of Zob and an ally in the fight against Magnacat in "The Last Tamer". In the second season, he is a teacher at the Ancient Armory.

Cal is also a fifth level Tamer, and the son of Dan Tulasech.  He is one of the many allies in the fight against Magnacat in "The Last Tamer". In the second season, he is a teacher at the Ancient Armory.

In the comic series, he debuted in issue 15. it is shown that Lay Mamery has a crush on him, but he was not very observant about it. On his profile, he is 28 years old, and his favorite food is Eggplant with Parmesan cheese. In issue 28, he heard rumors that The Dark Four, a group of the first Dark Tamers, ha. But when Dan further investigated, he was possessed by his deceased brother, Ron Tulasech, who was one of the original Dark Four. It was so that Ron could use the 101st Door to use him, as well as Zick, Teddy, and Lay as sacrifices to restore his body, but they were all saved when Bombo and Elena fell through the door, and crash-landed. In the end, Dan left the Armory without saying goodbye.

Wally Machaby

Wally is a female Tamer with fifth level Dom energy, and an ally of Zob. She first appeared in the first-season episode, "The Last Tamer", when Zob summons the other Tamers to aid him in the fight against Magnacat. In the second season, she is a weapons training instructor at the Ancient Armory.

In the comic series, she first appeared in issue 15.

Elena's family

Harvey Potato
Harvey is Elena's father, who moved to Oldmill Village with his family. He is less prominent than his wife Julie, and works as a supermarket manager.

Harvey is voiced by Lucio Saccone (Italian).

Julie Potato
Julie is Elena's mother, who moved to Oldmill Village with her husband and daughter. She gets mad at Elena when she finds out that she has done something wrong. Despite this, she still loves Elena. In the episode "The Horn of Kong", she gave birth to twins, a boy and a girl (in the comic book series, their names are Charlie and Violet). Her characteristics resemble Greta's, only her blonde hair is shorter and her glasses are rounded and the frames are visible.

Julie is voiced by Gio'-Gio' Rapattoni (Italian).

Lonzo Potato
Lonzo is Elena's 8-year-old cousin. Elena has a strained relationship with him as he sometimes does weird things, such as acting like a cat to cheer her up when Purrcy was kidnapped. Since then, Elena goes to Zick's house to avoid him, every time he comes for a visit. When he sees Bombo and Synakutz Bu taking a picture of themselves and making themselves visible for a moment, Elena hears his scream, causing her to go help him with the situation, only to find his face getting misplaced after being eaten by Bombo. Lonzo gets excited by the world of monsters when Elena tells him about it. When Bombo eats him again to fix his face and back to normal, he stated that being normal isn't fun.

In the comic book series, he is called Porter instead of Lonzo.

Lonzo is voiced by Irene Scalzo (Italian).

Purrcy
Purrcy is Elena's pet cat who always tries to make friends with Timothy and Jeremy, but ends up getting zapped or scratched in the face. He was catnapped in the first episode of the animated and comic series by Magnacat, who was looking for Tutors disguised as felines. Zick and Elena eventually find him in the later issues.

Puffy
Puffy is Elena's pet rabbit. Puffy has a prominent role in the episode "Claws", where he was transformed into a were-rabbit by Omnised and Omniquad with a use of a carrot of invulnerability, after receiving orders from Magnacat to attack Zick and Elena in the Oldmill's old shipyard. When Zick tried to suck Puffy in the Universal Dombox, it didn't work because Puffy was not a monster. When Elena recognized that the were-rabbit was her pet, she called him by his name, causing him to regain control of himself while in were-rabbit form. Puffy approached Elena, who touched him, and he transformed back to normal.

In the comic series, he was a replacement pet when Purrcy was missing. He also became a were-rabbit, but because of the Mask of Fire's evil influence instead of the carrot of invulnerability. He returned to normal when Zick captured him in a Dombox with lavender, a plant that is said to diminish monsters' and Tamers' powers.

Oldmill Village Elementary School

Patty Smirnov and Mattie O'Hare

Pattie and Mattie are the school's 'gossip spreaders'. In the comic book series, they are the editors of the school paper and if they find any gossip, they print it in the school newspaper. They first appeared in the comic book series when they introduced themselves to Elena and gave her a list of whom to go with and whom to avoid; this list was the reason Elena first learned about Zick. In the animated series, they were invited to a slumber party in "Bewitched Party" by Julie Potato without telling Elena about it.

They always get on Elena's nerves and she hopes that they will be moving to another section soon, according to the comic book series.

Patty and Mattie are voiced by Monica Bertolotti and Raffaella Castelli, respectively, in the original Italian version.

Soup and Ford
They are the class bullies. They aren't very smart and they follow the orders of their 'leader' David. In the comic book and animated series, they don't go with David any more since he was going with Annie instead of them.

Soup and Ford are voiced by Cinzia Villari and Paolo Vivio, respectively, in the original Italian version.

David McMackamack

David is a bully like Soup and Ford and likes to pick on Zick, but he hides a sensitive side, which they would learn later on. In the comic book series, David would stutter while talking (earning him the nickname 'DeDavid') but this was edited out of the cartoon. The stuttering was due to nervousness or anger, but when he felt safe, in his home for example, he would speak normally. Later on in the series, he found a new friend Annie and stopped bullying others, and started hanging out with her. He and Annie have feelings for one another.

David is voiced by Alessio Ward (Italian).

Annie Van Mousse

She appeared in episodes "Claws", "Bewitched Party", "The Haunted Skyscraper", and "Shoes for Bombo". In the comic book series, she is a shy person, and afraid of ghost stories, while in the animated series it was the opposite. It's implied that she is lactose intolerant, due to her fondness for soy-flavored soy ice cream. She became friends with Zick and Elena in "Bewitched Party". She and David have feelings for one another.

Miss Petula Swift

Zick and Elena's teacher in Oldmill Village Elementary School. In the 11th issue of the comic, she was shown practicing yoga to 'calm her mind' due to the annoyance of her students.

Other characters

Mr. Tobias
He is the owner of the Oldmill restaurant that Zick and Elena first suspected of kidnapping dogs in Oldmill.

Officer Jackson
She is a well known police officer in Oldmill and Big Burg. In the comic book and animated series, she has befriended Zick and Elena.

Digesting Plant
A plant monster that Timothy released to test Zick. After he tamed the monster, it completely follows and helps Zick and Elena.

Monsters

Monster-Si 
Monster-Si are good monsters who live in the Suspended City, which is controlled and protect by the Tutors (against the threats created by the evil monsters, the Monster-Ska). The Monster-Si follow the rules of their world, including the invisibility rule, and try to never to be noticed by humans.
 Bobaks - They are monsters dedicated to study and cultural activities. Inspired, cool, and pensive, they love to show off their brilliance and knowledge. Their bodies are made of a jelly-like transparent substance (when they are visible) that can change color according to their mood.
 Bombaks - They are hybrid offspring of a Bombo father and Bobak mother. Their bodies are the same as Bombos, yet they have four eyes. (If the father is a Bobak and the mother is a Bombo, the offspring is a Bobbo, an entirely different species altogether.)
 Bombos - They are big, happy, gluttonous monsters. They often cannot control their appetite and devour almost anything, edible or not. The Bombo is a peaceful monster; it makes friends easily and doesn't give too much importance to etiquette. Its way of greeting a friend is to swallow them and then spit them out.
 Bursties - These monsters are ethereal beings. Formed in a shape of bubble, they float in the air at the mercy of the wind. Humming is the only activity they can do and enjoy; unfortunately, their humming is considered annoying to every monster. When they get scared, they explode, however they can reappear in a few minutes.
 Flyvans - They are winged monsters that are naturally aggressive, but can be domesticated: normally they go through a long training period so that they can be ridden. They are strong, fiery, and competitive; for this reason they are very useful in battles with the evil Monster-Ska.
 Gingis - These monsters are vain and hedonist monsters. They love compliments and cannot stand criticism of the way they wear their tentacles on their heads, something that makes them particularly angry. They love to look beautiful and love excess; they adore human fashion, from which they rob and collect objects and jewelry of all sorts. Humans often find their jewelry or old-fashioned clothes in their homes, all preserved as precious treasures. Their appearance, to human eyes, would be eye-offending but standards in the Suspended City are different.
 Girtis - They are small, flying monsters that are sweet, gentle and fragile. However, they are hypersensitive and timid: they get frightened at nothing, fluttering madly in circles.
 Hahs - They are laughing monsters, who act as doctors in the monster world. According to them, anyone can cure illness with good humor, which has been studied and proposed in all its forms. They arrange stupid jokes to encourage laughter and they know many ways of laughing, from side-splitting laughs to chilling cackles. Other monsters don't often appreciate their bizarre sense of humor.
 Snyakutzes - They are monsters that lose pieces of their bodies. They mostly have more than two eyes, numerous arms and, at times, multiple legs. When they run, jump or move quickly in general, they can lose parts of their bodies (which can be put back together without any problem ... usually). As they grow old, their parts tend to remain separated and don't attach to their bodies.
 Varavans - They are monsters with the function of transporting other monsters around the streets.
 Vacuums - They are monsters with the function of transporting other monsters on the other skyscrapers, to arrive at the Suspended City.
 Zamurris - These are monsters that are joined with their nuclear family, sharing a body with one pair of legs.

Monster-Ska 
Monsters-Ska are monsters who, by nature and choice, are absolutely evil, and live outside and far from the Suspended City (very often in the human world). The Monster-Ska don't follow monster society rules and for this reason they are a constant danger to the good monsters, the Monster-Si. Some types of Monster-Ska live alone, while others live in very organized small and independent communities.
 Androgorkas - They are humans transformed into monsters by drinking the serum of invulnerability of the Gorkas, who control them with their mental powers and treat them like slaves. They appear to everyone as normal humans, however in reality they are half-monster and half-human.
 Big Bonz Eater - These monsters are big, bad-tempered Bombos, and they become horrendous and monstrous creatures that are capable of devouring practically everything, with their excessively large mouths. Sometimes in the comics and animated series, a Big Bonz Eater is referred to as 'Bonz Eateverything'.
 Foulers - They are small monsters that live in dimly lit, dirty and messy areas. Each Fouler loves rolling, crawling and wallowing in mold. If the environment they find themselves in is too clean, they quickly reduce that environment to suit their taste by generating filth.
 Gorkas - They are a dangerous race of monster not only for other monsters, but also for humans. They have the capacity to change shape to fit in their surroundings and can therefore easily mimic humans without following the invisibility rule. They also have the ability to control and manipulate minds.
 Mugalaks - They are among the biggest monsters in the monster world. They mostly live in caves, and their gigantic bodies are similar to that of dragons, even if they are fat and flabby. They have the ability to breathe fire to attack from long distances, and have big pores along their back form which they expel a deadly gas in the presence of their enemies, which humans perceive as geysers. They are very intelligent beings, but equally lazy.
 Pipluors - They are enormous, semi-liquid monsters composed of jelly-like, flexible mass equipped with hundreds of eyes to identify its prey. Normally they live in isolated places, mostly in humid, underground locations. They cover their prey with their sticky bodies until the creature is engulfed.
 Squarks - These monsters belong to the family of water monsters and are enemies of the monster society, where they are ravenous predators. Each Squark is ferocious, invisible and harmless to humans, but it populates all waters from oceans to large rivers, right up to the smallest mountain lake.
 Water Worms - They are monsters that mainly live in water, their natural environment; however as amphibians, they can also easily move around on land. Shaped like snakes, their bodies are very long, flexible and suitable for swimming and slithering. Their body hides little mouths with sharp teeth, which they use to devour all sorts of living things.

The Tutors 
Tutors are monsters who are very intelligent and authoritative by nature, so as to have assumed a supervisory role over the other monsters of the Suspended City, and protect them from the Monster-Ska and the dangers of the world of humans.
 Guard Tutors - They have the task of enforcing the law on all Monsters in the Suspended City, and they strictly obey the Maximum Tutors.
 Maximum Tutors - They have the highest authority, and represent the law and govern the world of monsters. In the Suspended City, the most powerful among them are the Great Council, and they are: Bartleby-Bath, Carnaby-Croth, Deputy-Deth and Jeremy-Joth.
 Natural Tutors - These Tutors are sent into the world of humans. When they do they take the form of cats, a discreet enough creature so they can get around without being noticed. They are in charge of monitoring the operation of the Detention Oasis, by protecting and re-educating the monster prisoners.
 Stellar Tutors - These are Tutors given to those who are honored and merit in experience, regardless of the position.

The Gaiga-Monsters 
Gaiga-Monsters are species of monsters that roamed during ancient times, bent on massacre and destruction. They were invisible, and very lethal to humans, who thought their destruction came from earthquakes and hurricanes, and they were feared even by the Monster-Ska. They were sent to the deepest bowels of the earth by the alliance between Tamers and Tutors.
 Blind Eye and Blood of the Earth - These two monsters attack together with different styles. Blood of the Earth can see a long distance and guides Blind Eye, which can't see but it moves quickly.
 Magmalon the Flagellator - This giant stingray-like monster acts as a transport to the Shadow of the Abysses. It can fire rays from its mouth, and releases Magmillions to attack or to protect the Magmalon.
 Magmillions - They are small versions of the Magmalon. These monsters attack in swarms and will eat anything in their path.
 Shadow of the Abysses - This gigantic monster can climb though the skyscraper very quickly, but it needs the Magamalon to travel faster. The monster is strongly immune to the Energy Dom, and it's difficult to stop its pace.
 The No Name - This gigantic monster was stated to be indestructible and unstoppable, and it's so enormous that when it moves in the ocean it causes a tidal wave. The only weakness of this monster is that when it eats too much Energy Dom it will devour itself.
 Tulkamans - This sub-species of the Gaiga-Monsters is dangerous to anyone. This slug-like monster has seven eyes with no hearing organs that makes it immune to the Voice Dom, and its saliva is white-hot and acidic, melting anything it touches.

Other monsters 
They are some monsters that were not categorized as Monster-Si or Monster-Ska, but they are unique. Some of these monsters are peaceful, dangerous, and extinct.
 Bommerbang - This ancient monster was extinct long ago. It has the ability to fly and can breathe fire from its mouth. This monster is so dangerous to fight directly that the Tamers use a self-catching Dombox, using maggots as bait since it's the monster's favorite food.
 Chameleon - This lizard-like monster is very quick, and can climb on anything. It has the ability to hide in different containers, but the monster will be weakened if it hides too much.
 Digesting Plant - The plant monster is very dangerous. The moment it is released, it can eat almost anything that it sees. When a Monster Tamer captures this monster and uses the voice Dom, it will obey the command and become friendly with anyone it knows.
 Gragnock - This iguana-like monster can climb though anything and moves quickly. This monster is strong, and it uses its tongue and tails as an attack on its enemies.
 Grunts - They are bold and malicious monsters. They are very intense, strong and rebellious. They love gaining luxury and wealth, and mostly take great pleasure at scaring humans by ignoring the invisibility rule.
 Kamalus - These are rare birds with colorful feathers, and they are only friendly to Bombos. In the tradition of Kamaludum-Si, if a baby Bombo takes a feather from their nest, it becomes the king of the Bombos.
 Megarock - A giant worm-like monster that lives underground and feeds off minerals. They can burrow quickly to move faster.
 Melter - This monster is very dangerous to fight very close since its body is made of heated rocks, and can release fire from its body that can melt or burn anything around it.
 Monster-Saur - This gigantic monster is very powerful and dangerous to fight alone. It uses its teeth, claws, tail, and fiery breath to attack its enemies. When it moves people think it's an earthquake, and it can only be tamed and controlled by using The Horn of Kong.
 Polypolipo - This enormous squid-like monster is considered to be the most dangerous of all the monsters. It lives deep in the swamp, and uses its giant tentacles to attack or devour its enemies.
 Purpidoch - This enormous aquatic spider-like predator is harmless to humans, but it's lethal to all monsters. It lives underwater, and then resurfaces to hunt monsters by spitting web from its mouth to catch its prey.
 River Monsters - These peaceful monsters live in the rivers, and they act as transportation by following the Tamers with their Voice Dom.
 Rooge - This ancient monster was thought to be extinct long ago. This butterfly-like bird monster is easily distracted when seeing a light. It has the ability to suck the vital energy of a human being by firing a ray for its mouth, and attacks its enemies with its beak.
 Sluggos - They are shape-shifting monsters that are similar to Gorkas. They create toxic slime that can melt any substance, which can be solidified by the Energy Dom.
 Sphinx - This ancient monster has the ability to fly, and can turn anything, even Dom items, into dust. This monster can only be stopped by using the Gesture Dom, and Energy Dom has to be a descendant of an ancient set of guardians.

References

Fictional schoolteachers
Fantasy television characters
Characters
Lists of characters in Italian television animation
Lists of Disney characters
Lists of comics characters